Almanor (formerly, Plumas Pines) was a census-designated place (CDP) in Plumas County, California, United States. The population was 0 at the 2010 Census.

History
The name comes from three daughters of Guy C. Earl, president of the Great Western Power Co.: "Alice", "Martha", and "Elinor". The Almanor post office opened in 1926.

Geography 
Almanor is located at  (40.216857, -121.177325), on the south-west shoreline of Lake Almanor.

Demographics 

As of the 2010 Census, there were no people living in the CDP.

References

External links 
Chester Progressive - Local newspaper

Census-designated places in Plumas County, California
Populated places established in 1926
Census-designated places in California